Wanda Makuch-Korulska (1919–2007) was a Polish medical doctor, specialist in neurology. Member of the Armia Krajowa Polish resistance during World War II; received the Righteous Among the Nations in 1995.

Scientific papers
"Dystonia in multiple sclerosis," 1992, Polish
"Somatosensory evoked potentials (SSEP) in patients with multiple sclerosis (MS)," 1989, Polish
"Decaris in the treatment of multiple sclerosis," 1984, Polish
"Influence of Tolseram on muscle tone," 1970, Polish
"Immunoelectrophoretic examinations of serum proteins in patients with multiple sclerosis," 1970, Polish

External links
Makuch-Korulska at the U.S. National Library of Medicine 
Wanda Makuch-Korulska – her activity to save Jews' lives during the Holocaust, at Yad Vashem website

1919 births
2007 deaths
Home Army members
Polish neurologists
Polish Righteous Among the Nations
University of Warsaw alumni
Physicians from Warsaw